Sidney Charles Hudson (January 3, 1915 – October 10, 2008) was a starting pitcher in Major League Baseball who played for the Washington Senators (1940–42, 1946–52) and Boston Red Sox (1952–54) who had a lengthy post-playing career as a pitching coach and scout.

Biography
Hudson entered baseball in 1938 with the Class D Sanford Lookouts, who had a working agreement with the Senators. In his second year with Sanford, Hudson led the Florida State League in games won (24), winning percentage (24–4, .857), earned run average (1.79) and strikeouts (192). He appeared in the 1941 midsummer classic on July 8 at Briggs Stadium and worked the seventh inning, allowing a two-run home run to Arky Vaughan that put the rival National League ahead, 3–2. (The American League would triumph in the ninth inning, however, on a three-run, walk-off homer by Ted Williams).

Hudson's career was interrupted by three years (1943–45) of military service during World War II. A veteran of the United States Army Air Forces, he served in the Pacific Theater of Operations and attained the rank of sergeant. On April 27, 1947, Hudson was the starting pitcher against the New York Yankees on Babe Ruth Day at Yankee Stadium. In front of 58,000 fans in one of Ruth's last public appearances, Hudson threw a complete game, 1–0 shutout, scattering eight hits and three bases on balls. He was traded to the rebuilding Red Sox in the middle of the  campaign, and went 16–22 as a spot starter and reliever over 2 years. 

He retired from the field after the  campaign. In his 12-season MLB career, Hudson posted a 104–152 record with 734 strikeouts, 123 complete games, 11 shutouts, 13 saves, and a 4.28 earned run average in 2,181 innings pitched. He allowed 2,384 hits and 835 bases on balls. A good-hitting pitcher, he batted .220 with 164 hits and 75 runs batted in during his big-league tenure.

Following his pitching career, he scouted for the Red Sox from 1955 through 1960, then joined the expansion edition of the Senators in 1961 as the team's first pitching coach. In between those assignments, Hudson served the team as a minor league pitching instructor. After leaving professional baseball in 1985, he was a pitching coach for Baylor University's varsity baseball team.
 
At the time of his death, at 93 years of age, Hudson was one of the oldest living major league players. He died in Waco, Texas.

Highlights
Twice American League All-Stars (1941–42)
As a rookie in 1940, won 17 games and pitched two one-hitters, and was runner-up rookie of the year
Was fourth in wins (17) and in shutouts (5), fifth in home runs allowed (20), and third in hits allowed (272), in the American League in 1940

References

External links
Sid Hudson - Baseballbiography.com
Baseball Reference
News Story and partial interview with Sid
 Buried at Oakwood Cemetery (Waco, Texas)

 

1915 births
2008 deaths
American League All-Stars
Baseball coaches from Tennessee
Baseball players from Tennessee
Boston Red Sox players
Boston Red Sox scouts
Burials at Oakwood Cemetery (Waco, Texas)
Major League Baseball pitchers
Major League Baseball pitching coaches
People from Morgan County, Tennessee
Sanford Lookouts players
Texas Rangers coaches
Texas Rangers scouts
United States Army Air Forces personnel of World War II
United States Army Air Forces soldiers
Washington Senators (1901–1960) players
Washington Senators (1961–1971) coaches